Thimoléone-Rose-Caroline Chevalier Lavit, known by her married name as Alexandrine-Caroline (or Caroline or simply Mme) Branchu (2 November 1780 – 14 October 1850) was a French opera soprano with origins from the free people of colour of Saint-Domingue where she was born at Cap-Français, the former French colony which is the modern-day Cap-Haïtien,  Haiti. A gifted vocalist, for the better part of the first quarter of the 19th century, she was a leading soprano at the Paris Opéra.

Branchu was one of the first students at the Paris Conservatoire after it opened in 1795, and studied singing under Pierre Garat.

Although Branchu frequently performed works by Christoph Willibald Gluck and was notable for roles in Anacréon and Les Abencérages by Luigi Cherubini, she is best remembered for her performances in the title role of Gaspare Spontini's most important opera, La vestale (1807). She also performed in Spontini's Fernand Cortez (1809) and Olympie (1819). She was briefly a mistress of Napoleon.

Branchu died in the Parisian suburb of Passy and was buried in the Père Lachaise Cemetery.

References
Notes

Sources
 Berlioz À Travers Chants (1862) Michel Lévy Publishers
 

French operatic sopranos
1780 births
1850 deaths
Burials at Père Lachaise Cemetery
Conservatoire de Paris alumni
19th-century French actresses
French stage actresses
Mistresses of Napoleon
Haitian women singers
People from Cap-Haïtien
Haitian people of French descent
People of Saint-Domingue
19th-century French women singers